Jewish World Review is a free, online magazine updated Monday through Friday (except for legal holidays and holy days), which seeks to appeal to "people of faith and those interested in learning more about contemporary Judaism from Jews who take their religion seriously."

It carries informational articles related to Judaism, dozens of syndicated columns written mostly by politically conservative writers, both Jewish and Gentile, advice columns on a number of issues, and cartoons.

The founder and editor-in-chief, Binyamin L. Jolkovsky, is a rabbinical school graduate and a former correspondent for Yated Ne'eman, an Israeli daily. 

Although the magazine is written to appeal to Orthodox Jews, Jolkovsky said he seeks a broader readership because "there are a lot of Christians who live Jewish values better than some Jews." Regarding his magazine's political orientation, he said: "It is hard to understand a religious person who votes Democrat... Maimonides, the great Jewish philosopher, said there are ten levels of charity, tzedakah. The highest level is making a person self-sufficient, which sounds like what the GOP wants to do."

Political Positions

The magazine's inaugural states that it will not be "preachy or partisan," but it is described by the Center for Media and Democracy as "politically conservative and religiously-minded. Conservative political pundit Tony Snow, who served as the 25th White House Press Secretary, was a regular contributor to the magazine where he wrote articles claiming that Africa "remains stubbornly tribal", and that sex education is a "condom cult" promoted by activists who "want Uncle Sam to enter children's bedrooms."

A 19 December 2022 article by regular contributor and Jewish News Syndicate editor-in-chief Jonathan S. Tobin wrote that defending Jewish identity required opposition to "woke leftist doctrines" such as "Intersectional ideology and critical race theory". He argued that anti-Semitism is on the rise in the United States, and blamed "the far-right, fundamentalist Islam, the intersectional left and an African-American community influenced by the Black Lives Matter movement and hatemongers like the Nation of Islam's Louis Farrakhan."

References

External links
 Official website

Conservative magazines published in the United States
Jewish magazines published in the United States
Jewish websites
Magazines established in 1997
Magazines published in New York City
Online magazines published in the United States